The Tacoma Mausoleum is a mausoleum in Tacoma, Washington, United States. Built in 1910, the mausoleum was the first such structure in the U.S. to be built west of the Mississippi River. The building was added to the National Register of Historic Places in 2000.

In 1918, the mausoleum was sued by David Rea and his wife, who claimed that the existence of a mausoleum near homes constituted a nuisance. They were suing in an attempt to prevent the already built mausoleum from adding further structures on its premises, but the Washington Supreme Court ruled against them.

See also 
 Afterglow Vista: Mausoleum in San Juan County, Washington
 National Register of Historic Places listings in Pierce County, Washington

References

Sources
 Reiter, Darlyne A. (2007). South Tacoma, Arcadia Publishing.
 Washington Supreme Court (1919). Cases Determined in the Supreme Court of Washington, Bancroft-Whitney Co.

National Register of Historic Places in Tacoma, Washington
Neoclassical architecture in Washington (state)
Buildings and structures completed in 1910
Buildings and structures in Tacoma, Washington
Monuments and memorials on the National Register of Historic Places in Washington (state)
Mausoleums on the National Register of Historic Places
1910 establishments in Washington (state)
Death in Washington (state)